Vanadyl(IV) sulfate describes a collection of inorganic compounds of vanadium with the formula, VOSO4(H2O)x where 0 ≤ x ≤ 6. The pentahydrate is common. This hygroscopic blue solid is one of the most common sources of vanadium in the laboratory, reflecting its high stability. It features the vanadyl ion, VO2+, which has been called the "most stable diatomic ion".

Vanadyl sulfate is an intermediate in the extraction of vanadium from petroleum residues, one commercial source of vanadium.

Synthesis, structure, and reactions
Vanadyl sulfate is most commonly obtained by reduction of vanadium pentoxide with sulfur dioxide:
V2O5 +  7 H2O  + SO2  +  H2SO4   →  2 [V(O)(H2O)4]SO4

From aqueous solution, the salt crystallizes as the pentahydrate, the fifth water is not bound to the metal in the solid. Viewed as a coordination complex, the ion is octahedral, with oxo, four equatorial water ligands, and a monodentate sulfate.  The trihydrate has also been examined by crystallography. A hexahydrate exists below . Two polymorphs of anhydrous VOSO4 are known.

The V=O bond distance is 160 pm, about 50 pm shorter than the V–OH2 bonds. In solution, the sulfate ion dissociates rapidly.

Being widely available, vanadyl sulfate is a common precursor to other vanadyl derivatives, such as vanadyl acetylacetonate:

[V(O)(H2O)4]SO4  +  2 C5H8O2  +  Na2CO3 →  [V(O)(C5H7O2)2]  +  Na2SO4  +  5 H2O  + CO2

In acidic solution, oxidation of vanadyl sulfate gives yellow-coloured vanadyl(V) derivatives. Reduction, e.g. by zinc, gives vanadium(III) and vanadium(II) derivatives, which are characteristically green and violet, respectively.

Occurrence in nature
Like most water-soluble sulfates, vanadyl sulfate is only rarely found in nature. Anhydrous form is pauflerite, a mineral of fumarolic origin. Hydrated forms, also rare, include hexahydrate (stanleyite), pentahydrates (minasragrite, orthominasragrite, and anorthominasragrite) and trihydrate - bobjonesite.

Medical research
Vanadyl sulfate is a component of food supplements and experimental drugs. Vanadyl sulfate exhibits insulin-like effects.

Vanadyl sulfate has been extensively studied in the field of diabetes research as a potential means of increasing insulin sensitivity.  No evidence indicates that oral vanadium supplementation improves glycaemic control. Treatment with vanadium often results in gastrointestinal side-effects, primarily diarrhea.

Vanadyl sulfate is also marketed as a health supplement, often for bodybuilding. Deficiencies in vanadium result in reduced growth in rats. Its effectiveness for bodybuilding has not been proven; some evidence suggests that athletes who take it are merely experiencing a placebo effect.

References

Vanadium(IV) compounds
Sulfates
Vanadyl compounds